Kiyanskaya is a rural locality (a village) in Verkhovskoye Rural Settlement, Tarnogsky District, Vologda Oblast, Russia. The population was 17 as of 2002.

Geography 
Kiyanskaya is located 41 km west of Tarnogsky Gorodok (the district's administrative centre) by road. Verkhovsky Pogost is the nearest rural locality.

References 

Rural localities in Tarnogsky District